Lakoff is a surname. Notable people with the surname include:

George Lakoff (born 1941), American linguist and cognitive scientist
Robin Lakoff (born 1942), American feminist and sociolinguist
 (born 1931), American emeritus research professor of political science